Arcangelo Chiocchetti (6 March 1921 – 30 June 2001) was an Italian cross-country skier. He competed in the men's 18 kilometre event at the 1948 Winter Olympics.

References

External links
 

1921 births
2001 deaths
Italian male cross-country skiers
Olympic cross-country skiers of Italy
Cross-country skiers at the 1948 Winter Olympics
Sportspeople from Trentino